The Sweetest Days is the third studio album by American singer Vanessa Williams, released on December 6, 1994, by Wing Records and Mercury Records. The album peaked at number 57 on the US Billboard 200 and at number 25 on the Top R&B/Hip-Hop Albums chart, and has been certified platinum by the Recording Industry Association of America (RIAA).

The album includes the singles "You Can't Run", "Betcha Never", "The Way That You Love", and the title track. It also includes the first recording of the song "Higher Ground" later covered by Barbra Streisand as the title track from her 1997 self-titled album, as well as cover versions of songs previously recorded by Patti Austin and Sting. The album was re-released in 1995 with the additional track "Colors of the Wind", the theme from the Disney animated film Pocahontas.

"The Way That You Love" and "You Can't Run" were nominated at the 1996 Grammy Awards for Best R&B Vocal Performance, Female and Best R&B Song, respectively.

Track listing

Notes
  signifies a co-producer

Personnel 
Adapted from AllMusic.

 Abenaa – composer, background vocals
 Laythan Armor – arranger, composer, fender rhodes, programming, rhythm arrangements
 Ryan Arnold – assistant engineer
Patti Austin – composer
 Roy Ayers – guest artist, vibraphone
 Babyface – composer, drum programming, guest artist, keyboards, producer
 Ron Blake – saxophone
 Anthony Block – cover typeset
 Jeff Bova – keyboards, mellotron, programming, strings, synthesizer programming
 Gerry Brown – arranger, composer, guitar, keyboards, mixing, electric piano, producer, special effects, tape effects
 Jackie Brown – assistant producer, production assistant
 Larry Carlton – guest artist, guitar
 Eric Carmen – composer
 Bryan Carrigan – assistant engineer
 Ron Carter – acoustic bass, guest artist
 Marietta Ciriello – stylist
 Tim Conklin – assistant engineer
 Mick Corey – technical support
 Dominic Cortese – accordion
 Martin Czembor – assistant engineer
 Paulinho Da Costa – guest artist, percussion
 Kenwood Dennard – drums
 Joel Diamond – organ
 J. Dibbs – arranger, composer, producer, programming, rhythm arrangements
 Tim Donovan – assistant engineer
 Steve Dorff – composer
 Derek Duffey – production assistant
 Barry Duryea – technical support
 Suzanne Dyer – assistant engineer
 Ed Eckstine – executive producer
 Peter Erskine – drums
 Tabitha Fair – background vocals
 Brent Fischer – orchestration, strings orchestrator
 Clare Fischer – conductor, string arrangements
 Eric Fischer – assistant engineer
 Phil Galdston – arranger, composer, keyboards, producer, synthesizer, synthesizer programming, vocal arrangement
 Odile Gilbert – hair stylist
 Brad Gilderman – engineer
 Carl Glanville – assistant engineer
 Carl Gorodetzky – contractor
 George Gree – composer
 Roger Guth – composer
 Mick Guzauski – mixing
 Mark Hammond – drum programming, programming
 Roy Hargrove – guest artist, trumpet
 Kenny Hicks – vocal arrangement, background vocals
 Dann Huff – acoustic guitar, electric guitar
 Ronn Huff – conductor, string arrangements
 Bunny Hull – composer, background vocals
 Anthony Jackson – bass
 Tim Leitner – assistant engineer, engineer, mixing assistant
 Jon Lind – composer
 Peter Lindbergh – photography
 Marty Maidenberg – artwork, cover design, package layout
 Bill Malina – digital editing, engineer, mixing
 Stephanie Marais – make-up
 James Mayer – composer
 Peter Mayer – composer
 Brian McKnight – guest artist
 Joe Mennona – accordion
 Vaughn Merrick – assistant engineer
 Jay Militscher – assistant engineer
 Jen Monnar – assistant engineer
 Todd Moore – production coordination
 Nick Moroch – arranger, composer, guitar, guitars, mandolin, mellotron, synthesizer, synthesizer bass
 James Murphy – drums
The Nashville String Machine – strings
 Marty Ogden – assistant engineer
 Pino Palladino – bass, bass slide
 Greg Parker – assistant engineer
 Leon Pendarvis – piano
 Jamey Perenot – assistant engineer
 Greg Phillinganes – fender rhodes
 Joe Pirrera – assistant engineer
 Herb Powers – mastering
 Morris Repass – conductor, string contractor
 Marnie Riley – assistant engineer
 Max Risenhoover – digital Editing
 Donald Robinson – composer
 Rory Romano – assistant engineer
 Armand Sabal-Lecco – bass
 Philippe Saisse – keyboards, piano
 Al Schmitt – engineer
 Ivy Scott – production coordination
 Mike Scott – mixing, assistant engineer
 Ira Siegel – guitar
 Ricardo Silveira – guitar
 Dexter Simmons – assistant engineer
 Artie Smith – technical support
 Bill Smith – assistant engineer
 Robert Smith – assistant engineer
 Soul Man – rap
 Brian Sperber – assistant engineer
 Carol Steele – percussion
 Sting – composer, guest artist, background vocals
 Casey Stone – assistant Engineer
 Toots Thielemans – guest artist, harmonica
 Keith Thomas – arranger, bass, piano, producer, programming, string arrangements, synthesizer programming
 Chris Thompson – art direction
 Fonzi Thornton – background vocals
 Wendy Waldman – composer
 Randy Walker – MIDI programming, programming
 Brock Walsh – arranger, composer, vocal arrangement, background vocals
 Bill Whittington – engineer, mixing
 Christian "Wicked" Wicht – technical support
 King Williams – assistant engineer
 Vanessa Williams – arranger, lead vocals, primary artist, producer, vocal arrangement, vocals, background vocals
 Victor Winograd – cartage
 Dann Wojnar – assistant engineer

Charts

Weekly charts

Year-end charts

Certifications

References

1994 albums
Albums produced by Babyface (musician)
Albums produced by Brian McKnight
Albums recorded at Capitol Studios
Albums recorded at Electric Lady Studios
Albums recorded at Westlake Recording Studios
Mercury Records albums
Vanessa Williams albums
Wing Records albums